"Kentucky Gambler" is a 1974 song written and performed by Dolly Parton.  "Kentucky Gambler" was issued as a track from Dolly Parton's The Bargain Store album from 1975.

Content
A classic Dolly Parton story song, "Kentucky Gambler" tells the story of a miner from Kentucky who abandons his wife and children for the bright lights of Reno, where he initially does very well at gambling, "winning at everything he played".  Eventually, however, his winning streak comes to a halt, as he loses all of his winnings. Broke, he returns home, only to find that his wife has found someone else and has moved on without him. He concludes that "a gambler loses much more than he wins".

Merle Haggard recording
That same year, Merle Haggard and The Strangers covered "Kentucky Gambler" and it was their nineteenth number one song on the country chart.   The Merle Haggard and The Strangers version stayed at number one for a single week and spent a total of eleven weeks on the chart.

Coincidentally, Parton's The Bargain Store album featured a cover of a Haggard composition, "You'll Always Be Special to Me". The following year, Haggard would cover another Dolly Parton song, "The Seeker".

Personnel for Merle Haggard version
Merle Haggard– vocals, guitar
The Strangers:
Roy Nichols – lead guitar
Norman Hamlet – steel guitar, dobro
 Tiny Moore – mandolin
 Ronnie Reno – guitar
 Mark Yeary – piano
 Johnny Meeks - bass
Biff Adam – drums
Don Markham – saxophone

Charts

Weekly charts

Year-end charts

References

1974 singles
Songs written by Dolly Parton
Dolly Parton songs
Merle Haggard songs
Song recordings produced by Ken Nelson (American record producer)
Capitol Records singles
1974 songs
Songs about Kentucky